Clement Sibusiso Mazibuko (born 16 September 1977 in Benoni, Gauteng) is a former South African football midfielder. He spent the majority of his career representing South African clubs in domestic competitions, with a short spell in Greece. He is a former international with South Africa, having earned a total of 8 caps during 2001–2003.

Career
Mazibuko started his career at Bush Bucks in 1998, where he spent 4 years before joining the Mamelodi Sundowns in 2003. He briefly joined struggling Greek Superleague side Ergotelis on loan in 2005, returning to the Mamelodi Sundowns later that year to help them win the South African Premier Division twice, in the 2005–06 and 2006–07 seasons. Mazibuko then moved to newly promoted Thanda Royal Zulu in 2007, and followed them to the National First Division after the club was relegated at the end of the season. He joined fellow National First Division competitors Batau in 2010 to drop to the Second Division as the club was relegated at the end of the 2010–11 season.

Mazibuko returned to top-flight in 2013 signing with South African Premier Division side SuperSport United for the 2013–14 Premier Division season. He then retired in 2014, at age 36.

International
Mazibuko made a dream debut for South Africa, coming in as a substitute on the 88th minute and scoring his first international goal within 60 seconds on 29 April 2001, during the 1st round of the 2001 COSAFA Cup vs. Mozambique.

International goals

Honours

Club
Mamelodi Sundowns F.C.
 South African Premier Division: 2005–06, 2006–07

References

External links

1977 births
Living people
People from Benoni
South African soccer players
South Africa international soccer players
Thanda Royal Zulu F.C. players
Mamelodi Sundowns F.C. players
Bush Bucks F.C. players
Ergotelis F.C. players
Super League Greece players
Expatriate footballers in Greece
South African expatriates in Greece
Association football midfielders
Batau F.C. players
SuperSport United F.C. players
Sportspeople from Gauteng